The Live Earth concert in Germany was held at HSH Nordbank Arena, Hamburg on 7 July 2007.

Running order
In order of appearance:

Shakira  - "Don't Bother", "Inevitable", "Dia Especial" with Gustavo Cerati, "Hips Don't Lie" (HSH 13:05)
Snoop Dogg- "The Next Episode", "Ups & Downs", "Snoop's Upside Ya Head" "I Wanna Love You" (solo), "Drop It Like It's Hot", "Who Am I (What's My Name)?" (HSH 13:40)
Roger Cicero - "Kompromisse","Frauen regier'n die Welt", "Zieh die Schuh aus" (HSH 14:05)
MIA. - "Tanz der Moleküle", "Engel" (HSH 14:30)
Sasha - "Coming Home", "Chemical Reaction", "Lucky Day" (HSH 14:55)
Stefan Gwildis - "Tanzen Übern Kiez", "Wie ein richtiger Mensch" (HSH 15:20)
Marquess - "El Temperamento", "Vayamos Companeros" (HSH 15:45)
Maria Mena - "Sorry", "Just Hold Me", "What a Wonderful World" (HSH 16:10)
Silbermond - "Lebenszeichen", "Zeit für Optimisten" (HSH 16:35)
Michael Mittermeier - "Stand Up Comedy" (HSH 16:55)
Reamonn with Ritmo Del Mundo - "Serpentine", "Tonight (with Buena Vista Social Club)" (HSH 17:20)
Samy Deluxe - "Let's Go", "Weck Mick Auf" (HSH 17:42)
Enrique Iglesias - "Be With You", "Bailamos", "Don't You (Forget About Me)", "Escape" (HSH 18:10)
Katie Melua - "Nine Million Bicycles", "On the Road Again", "Spider's Web" and "Thankyou, Stars" (HSH 18:45)
Jan Delay - "Klar", "Türlich" with Das Bo, "Feuer" (HSH 19:20)
Lotto King Karl - "Glaube Liebe Hoffnung", "Hamburg meine Perle" (HSH 19:50)
Revolverheld - "Ich werd die Welt verändern", "Freunde bleiben" (HSH 20:15)
Mando Diao - "Ode To Ochrasy", "Long Before Rock 'n' Roll" (HSH 20:40)
Juli - "Zerrissen", "Wir beide", "Perfekte Welle" (HSH 21:05)
Chris Cornell - "You Know My Name", "Arms Around Your Love", "Wide Awake", "Black Hole Sun" (HSH 21:30)
Cat Stevens/Yusuf Islam - "Where Do the Children Play?", "Midday", "Ruins", "Wild World", "Saturn",  "Peace Train" (HSH 21:45)

Presenters
Katarina Witt
Nova Meierhenrich
Bianca Jagger
Gülcan
Elton
Tim Mälzer
Stefan Gödde

Notes 
Snoop Dogg performed the song "The Next Episode" in his set. A few hours earlier Xzibit had performed the same song in the Tokyo concert.

Coverage

Television
N24 and Pro7 did the television live coverage.

Online
MSN were responsible for the online broadcasting of the concert.

References

External links
Official Live Earth website
MSN Live Earth website

Germany
Rock festivals in Germany
2000s in Hamburg
2007 in German music
July 2007 events in Europe
Music in Hamburg
Events in Hamburg